Bandar Sunway, also known as Sunway City, is an 800-acre integrated township in Subang Jaya, Selangor, Malaysia. This township is named after its developer, Sunway Group, which had also got its name from Sungai Way, a suburb in Selangor.

Leisure and Entertainment  

Sunway Pyramid is a shopping centre opened in July 1997 as Malaysia's first themed shopping and entertainment mall. One of the mall's most easily recognised designs is the Egyptian-inspired Pyramid with a lion "standing guard" at the entrance. The rest of the building is embellished in the monumental style, complete with pseudo-hieroglyphics decorating facades, along with numerous Pharonic statuaries.

In the center of Sunway is the amusement park Sunway Lagoon, which has many different themed parks, including some of the biggest rides in Malaysia and a large water park.

There is also a lot of commercial building in Bandar Sunway with different type of restaurants, banks and other.

Accommodation 

Bandar Sunway has a range of accommodations, including the Sunway Resort Hotel & Spa, the Sunway Pyramid Hotel, and the Sunway Clio Hotel.

Education 

Sunway has also become known as a higher education hub, with two large universities in the area, namely Monash University Malaysia, and Sunway University, as well as other private colleges such as Sunway College, Le Cordon Bleu Malaysia and The One Academy.

There are other notable schools in Sunway which are SK Bandar Sunway, SMK Bandar Sunway, SK Kampung Lindungan and Sunway International School.

Healthcare 

Healthcare in Sunway is provided by private hospital, Sunway Medical Centre, along with Sime Darby Medical Centre (previously Subang Jaya Medical Centre) in adjacent Subang Jaya.

Religion 
Sunway comprises many other companies and residences not owned by the Sunway group. Places of worship include Masjid Al-Husna, which is located right opposite Sunway Pyramid. Several Buddhist Centres (like Subang Jaya Buddhist Association, Passaddhi Buddhist Centre and Dharma Drum Mountain Buddhist Centre) and churches are located in the vicinity as well, most notably the nearest Catholic churches would be St Ignatius Church in Kelana Jaya, Petaling Jaya as well as Church of the Assumption in Jalan Templer, Old Town, Petaling Jaya and the Church of St Thomas More in USJ, Subang Jaya.

Transport
Bandar Sunway is connected to the cities of Kuala Lumpur, Shah Alam, Petaling Jaya and Klang via a network of highways, namely the Federal Highway, the Shah Alam Expressway (KESAS), the New Klang Valley Expressway (NKVE), the New Pantai Expressway (NPE), the North–South Expressway Central Link (ELITE) and the Damansara–Puchong Expressway (LDP). The township is also served by an urban-suburb rail link, the Subang Jaya Komuter station.

Public transport 
Bandar Sunway is home to Malaysia's first (and to date, only) bus rapid transit line, the  BRT Sunway Line. It connects the  Setia Jaya Komuter station (Sunway-Setia Jaya) in the north until the  USJ7 station in the south, passing through Sunway Mentari, Sunway Pyramid and Monash University in the process.

A monorail service named Sunway Monorail (alternatively known as Suntrek 2000) operated in Bandar Sunway from 2000 to 2007 and was the second monorail system to operate in Malaysia following the Genting Monorail and the first public monorail in the country, opening in 2000 and predating the launch of the Kuala Lumpur Monorail by three years. There were two monorails primarily ran along a 3 km steel-tracked loop system surrounding the Sunway Lagoon water theme park, stopping at three key locations on the northern and western side of the loop: Sunway Pyramid East station, Sunway Pyramid West station (now Johnny Rockets hamburger restaurant) and Sunway College station, with a branch line extends 600m west towards the monorail system's depot from the loop. The monorail system operated with two five-car SL5 trains in its rolling stock; the trains produced by Severn-Lamb, a British locomotive manufacturer. The total cost of the loop was an estimated US$10 million. The system has since been shut down due to the expansion of the Sunway Pyramid 2, and part of its infrastructure were later incorporated into the BRT line.

Alternately, there are rapidKL bus services connecting Sunway Pyramid to  Subang Jaya station, some 15–20 minutes away. The Selangor state government also provides its subsidized bus service - the Smart Selangor bus route SJ02, connecting Bandar Sunway to  Puchong, allowing an alternative to the longer Puchong-Putra Heights-USJ 7 train ride.

Car
Bandar Sunway is located near the junction of the Damansara–Puchong Expressway and KL–Port Klang Federal Highway Federal Route 2. Motorists coming from Puchong, Putrajaya and even Seremban will opt for the LDP.

A few kilometres south lies another interchange, this time between the LDP and Shah Alam Expressway , which connects Pandamaran near Port Klang to Sri Petaling.

Running directly in front of Sunway Pyramid mall is the New Pantai Expressway , which runs from Subang Jaya to Angkasapuri in Lembah Pantai in southwestern Kuala Lumpur.

Politics and administration
The township falls within the neighbourhood sections of PJS 7 to PJS 11 (PJS meaning "Petaling Jaya Selatan" or Petaling Jaya South). Since 1997 much of Bandar Sunway was governed by the MBSJ, taking over from MBPJ. MBPJ however retains administration over the northern part of the township, including PJS 10, PJS 5, PJS 6, Sunway Mentari and Setia Jaya.

Bandar Sunway falls under the Subang constituency of the Malaysian Parliament, currently held by Wong Chen of the PKR.

On the state level, Bandar Sunway is represented in the Selangor State Legislative Assembly as part of Subang Jaya constituency. The incumbent assemblywoman for Subang Jaya is Michelle Ng from the DAP who succeeded Hannah Yeoh of the DAP since the aftermath of Malaysian general election, 2018.

References

External links
 Sunway Group Official Website
 Sunway Pyramid Mall
 Sunway Lagoon
 Sunway University

Subang Jaya
Sunway Group
Townships in Selangor